The 2nd Bangladesh National Film Awards presented by Ministry of Information to felicitate the best of Bangladeshi Cinema censored in the year 1976. It was the second ceremony of National Film Awards. Ceremony took place at Dhaka, Bangladesh on March 24, 1977, and awards were given by then President of Bangladesh. 20 films were submitted for different categories.

List of winners
This year, the best film artistes were awarded in 15 categories out of 19 categories.

Merit Awards

Technical Awards

See also
Meril Prothom Alo Awards
Ifad Film Club Award
Babisas Award

References

External links

National Film Awards (Bangladesh) ceremonies
Bangladesh National Film Awards
National Film Awards
National Film Awards
1970s in Dhaka